This is a list of historical and current movements, campaigns and political positions in Wales.

Current

Political 
 All Under One Banner Cymru
 Campaign for a new UK flag
 Labour for an independent Wales
 Opposition to the Prince of Wales title
 Proposed St David's Day bank holiday
 Unionism in Wales
 Welsh devolution
 Welsh independence
 Welsh republicanism
 YesCymru

Cultural 
 Celtic League
 Pan-Celticism
 Welsh Language Society
 Welsh nationalism

Sport 
 Logo of the Welsh Rugby Union#Controversy of the logo
 Proposed Wales national cricket team
 Sport in Wales#Calls for Wales Olympic team

Environmental 

 Campaign for the Protection of Rural Wales

Transport 

 North-South Wales railway - A campaign for a Swansea/Carmarthern rail line to Bangor connecting South and North Wales.

Historical

Political 
 Parliament for Wales Campaign – Organisation and movement for an elected legislative Welsh Parliament.
 Women's suffrage in Wales – Movement to secure women's right to vote in Wales.
 Yes for Wales – Welsh devolution campaign.
 Chartism in Wales – A movement for democratic rights.
 Cymru Fydd – A movement to increase awareness of Welsh national identity and promote Welsh devolution.

Cultural 

 Cool Cymru – A Welsh cultural movement including Welsh musical artists.
 Celtic Revival – A revival of Celtic expression of national identity through music, literature and the visual arts in Wales.

Religious 
 Welsh Methodist revival – A noncomformist, protestant movement in Wales.
 Nonconformity in Wales – A protestant establishment and movement in Wales.
 Welsh revival of 1904 – Religious revival in Wales, 1904 to 1905.

See also 
 Culture of Wales
 History of Wales

References 

Campaigns and movements in Wales
Political movements in Wales
Wales-related lists